Tai Po Market or Tai Po Hui is the name of an area within the modern-day Tai Po New Town in the Tai Po District, in the New Territories, Hong Kong. However, its exact location changed from time to time. It is considered as the town centre of the area known as Tai Po. The area was first established as a market town, at the location of the modern-day residential and commercial area Tai Po Old Market (or Tai Po Kau Hui), which is near the present-day area Tai Wo (Tai Wo Estate). Later on, a new market, Tai Wo Shi was established across the river and when the Kowloon-Canton Railway British Section was opened in 1910 it was the site of a flag station named Tai Po Market. However, all three areas do not overlap, and divided by Lam Tsuen River or Tai Po Tai Wo Road. Tai Po Market, Tai Po Old Market and Tai Wo Estate are all within modern day Tai Po New Town (Tai Po Town).

History

The first Tai Po Hui was established by the Tang clan Tai Po Tau branch in the Qing dynasty. In Kangxi Year edition of Xin'an Xianzhi (Gazetteer of the Xin'an County (or San-On County in the Cantonese language)), the market town was also known as Tai Po Tau Hui. In Jiaqing Year edition of the book, the place was known as Tai Po Hui. The market town was located in the northern shore of the Lam Tsuen river mouth. However, non-Tang villages formed their own alliance , and established Tai Wo Shi (literally Tai Wo Market) in the south shore of the river. The alliance also built a bridge to connect the two market towns in 1896. Before the establishment of Tai Wo Shi, non-Tang villages were forbidden to establish shops in Tang's Tai Po Hui by the Qing government. It was said Tai Po Hui was one of the three major market towns of Hong Kong in the early Qing dynasty. 

The area around the two Tai Po market towns, as well as other minor market towns, were leased to the British Empire in 1898. The region is now known as the New Territories. The colonial government built the Tai Po Market railway station next to the Tai Wo Shi in 1913. The District Office of the colonial Hong Kong government, also within the proximity of both new and old Tai Po Hui.

The railway station, also moved to the current site, east of the former place in the 1980s.

The two locations belong to the aforementioned Tai Po Hui constituency.

Tai Po Market (Tai Po Hui, formerly Tai Wo Shi)

Tai Wo Shi (Tai Wo Market), at modern day , was established in 1892. The market town was later known as Tai Po Hui (Tai Po Market). The street currently consisted of post-Qing dynasty buildings, except a well and a Man Mo Temple. The temple, at the heart of the Fu Shin Street, is a declared monument of Hong Kong. The former railway station of the market town, was converted into Hong Kong Railway Museum in the 1980s.

The market town Tai Wo Shi displaced the old Tai Po market town (Tang's Tai Po Hui) as the rural town centre of the area, which also took the ownership of the name Tai Po Hui (Tai Po Market). Some author credited the displacement was due to the accessibility of the new market.

Tai Po was one of the market towns that was selected to be expanded into a satellite town (new town) in 1972.

Tai Po Old Market (Tai Po Kau Hui)

Tai Po Old Market (Tai Po Kau Hui), in Xin'an Xianzhi, was also listed as villages (as Tai Po Hui) along with Tai Po Tau. The former market town, which was established in 1672, was unable to observe in the modern day Tai Po Old Market. A Tin Hau Temple existed in the modern day Tai Po Old Market. The temple was established by the Tang clan Tai Po Tau branch before 1691. It was said an ancestral temple, the Temple of the Filial Son was demolished in the 1970s.

Administration
Tai Po Hui and Tai Po Kau Hui are recognized villages under the New Territories Small House Policy.

See also
 Shenzhen (market town)
 Sha Tau Kok, another market town
 Luen Wo Hui, another market town
 Shek Wu Hui, another market town
 Tuen Mun Kau Hui
 Tuen Mun San Hui
 Yuen Long Kau Hui
 
 List of buildings, sites, and areas in Hong Kong

Footnotes

References

 
Places in Hong Kong